The Lower Sava Statistical Region (until December 31, 2014 ) is a statistical region in Slovenia. It has good traffic accessibility and is located in the Sava and Krka Valleys, with hilly areas with vineyards and an abundance of water. It is the second-smallest statistical region in Slovenia. The only nuclear power plant in the country and Čatež spa are located in the region. The region annually spends EUR 22 million on environmental protection. In 2013, the employment rate in the region was 57.5%. The region was characterized by the largest difference between the employment rate for men and for women (for men it was 12 percentage points higher than for women). In 2013 this region also stood out in number of convicted persons per 1,000 population (8.3).

Cities and towns 
The Lower Sava Statistical Region includes 5 cities and towns, the largest of which are Krško and Brežice.

Municipalities
The Lower Sava Statistical Region comprises six municipalities:

 Bistrica ob Sotli
 Brežice
 Kostanjevica na Krki
 Krško
 Radeče
 Sevnica

Demographics 
The population in 2020 was 70,349.

Economy 
Employment structure: 45.8% services, 50% industry, 4.2% agriculture.

Tourism 
It attracts 5.1% of the total number of tourists in Slovenia, most being from Slovenia (53%).

Transportation 
 Length of motorways: 
 Length of other roads:

Sources 

 Slovenian regions in figures 2014

Statistical regions of Slovenia
Lower Sava Valley